Asumi Takeda (born 14 July 2000) is a Japanese professional footballer who plays as a forward for WE League club Albirex Niigata Ladies.

Club career 
Takeda made her WE League debut on 12 September 2021.

References 

Living people
2000 births
Women's association football forwards
WE League players
Japanese women's footballers
Albirex Niigata Ladies players
Association football people from Kanagawa Prefecture